China National Gold Group Corporation (中国黄金集团有限公司) (CNGC or China Gold) is a centrally state owned Chinese gold corporation primarily engaged in the mining and refining of gold, silver, copper, and molybdenum.

Mining operations

Domestic
The company's key mines are in Inner Mongolia and Tibet. Chang Shan Hao (CSH) is the gold mine in Inner Mongolia and will produce about 200,000 ounces in 2014 according to the company's guidance.

In 2008, Ivanhoe Mines sold a controlling stake of 42 percent in Jinshan Gold Mines to China National Gold. The two companies also agreed to establish a "Strategic Chinese Exploration Partnership."

The company began developing the Jiama gold and copper mine in Tibet in 2008, undertaking a $520 million investment that was then the largest mining project in the province.  To maintain good relations with local communities, the company announced the hiring of 191 locals and stated 35% of the workforce was non-Han, the highest percentage of any mine in China.  A landslide in March 2013 buried a worker's camp, killing 83 miners, two of whom were Tibetans.  Government officials explained that the landslide was caused by a "natural geological disaster" rather than related to mining work.  An article by The Economist questioned the building of a worker's camp in an area of hazardous geology.

In April 2016, China Gold acquired an 82 percent stake in the Jinfeng gold mine in southern Guizhou province from Eldorado Gold for $300 million. Subject to regulatory review, the purchase was approved in September of the same year.

International
In pursuit of additional gold mining assets, the parent company and its international development subsidiary, China Gold International Resources, is active in scouting for overseas gold mines.  Explaining the acquisition strategy to the South China Morning Post, Song Xin, the chief executive of China Gold International Resources, stated the company was zealous in scouting for gold, copper, and silver mines across the world in both developed and developing countries. He stated that the company's current preference is for acquisitions and partnerships in countries close to China, specifically Mongolia, Russia and in Central Asia, but is also eyeing Canada, Australia and the US and destinations for investments.

Africa
The company has been in talks with Banro, a Canadian gold mining company, to form a joint venture to develop mines and the supporting electricity supply in the Democratic Republic of Congo. Preliminary talks between the miners were reported in April 2011 when the companies signed a non-binding memorandum of understanding (MOU).

China Gold made a bid at the end of 2012 for the Tanzania operations of Barrick Gold in a deal that would have exceed $2 billion.  However the deal didn't go through because of disagreements that included the sharing of surprise tax increases levied by Tanzania to take advantage of the capital gains bonanza from a successful deal and indemnification for a past violent episodes between Barrick and villagers. Despite this setback, enthusiasm for deal making was reiterated in a September 2013 comment made by China Gold executive Jerry Xie to Reuters when he stated the company continued to look for big potential deals.

In December 2013, China Gold acquired Soremi, a copper mining subsidiary located in the Republic of Congo, from the Gerald Group, a US-based metals trading company. This marked the beginning of a joint venture between China Gold and the Gerald Group to further develop the project.

In 2014, China Gold chief executive Song Xin confirmed that talks about investments into the African assets Ivanhoe Mines Ltd. were no longer active, after talks had started in the previous year.

Central Asia
CNGC in January 2012 acquired the Kuru-Tegerek Copper-Gold deposit, a copper and gold mine located in the Kyrgyz Republic, for $21 million from the Chaoyue Group. The mine contains 97.36 tons of gold and 1.02 million tons of copper.

Other business areas
The company is mainly engaged in mining. However, it also has a retail business offering custom-designed gold and silver bars. Outside of mining and minerals, the company is involved in irradiation sterilization services to food, medical, and cosmetics companies in China, Hong Kong, and Macao. Subsidiaries are also engaged in contract engineering, import and export, and labor services for more than 40 overseas companies. China Gold also produces gold industry news publications and is the official news outlet for the Shanghai Gold Exchange and Shanghai Diamond Exchange. 

It is the only Chinese company representing China on the World Gold Council Board.

References

External links
http://www.chinagoldgroup.com/

Gold mining companies of China
Mining companies of the Republic of the Congo